Calliopum aeneum is a species of fly in the family Lauxaniidae. It is found in the Palearctic.
The larva is a stem miner of Trifolium pratense.

References

External links
Ecology of Commanster

Lauxaniidae
Insects described in 1820
Muscomorph flies of Europe
Taxa named by Carl Fredrik Fallén